Great Hiwassee was an important Overhill settlement from the late 17th through the early 19th centuries.  It was located on the Hiwassee River in present-day Polk County, Tennessee, on the north bank of the river where modern U.S. Route 411 crosses the river.  The site is now part of the Tennessee Forestry Division's East Tennessee Nursery.

The town was linked to Great Tellico and Chota to the north, via the Great Indian Warpath, which followed Conasauga Creek into the mountains.  The path was heavily used by the Overhill Cherokee.

References
Duncan, Barbara R. and Riggs, Brett H. Cherokee Heritage Trails Guidebook. University of North Carolina Press: Chapel Hill (2003). 
Mooney, James. "Myths of the Cherokee" (1900, reprint 1995).  (see James Mooney)

Cherokee towns in Tennessee
Native American history of Tennessee
Former Native American populated places in the United States
Geography of McMinn County, Tennessee
Geography of Polk County, Tennessee
Former populated places in Tennessee
Cherokee Nation (1794–1907)